Jean Claude Saclag (born September 25, 1994 at Lubuagan, Kalinga) is a Filipino wushu and kickboxing practitioner. He studied at the University of the Cordilleras for his higher education and at St. Teresita's School for primary and secondary education. The youngest among the thirteen children of Lubuagan former vice mayor Patricio Saclag and Judith Kitong.

References

External links
Jean Claude Saclag -2014 Asian Games Athlete Profile

1994 births
Living people
Filipino sanshou practitioners
People from Kalinga (province)
Wushu practitioners at the 2014 Asian Games
Asian Games medalists in wushu
Asian Games silver medalists for the Philippines
Medalists at the 2014 Asian Games
Wushu practitioners at the 2018 Asian Games
University of the Cordilleras alumni
Competitors at the 2019 Southeast Asian Games
Competitors at the 2021 Southeast Asian Games
Southeast Asian Games gold medalists for the Philippines